This is a complete list of mayors of Syracuse, New York.

List of mayors

External links
"Mayors of Syracuse, New York," City of Syracuse, New York
Political Graveyard - Mayors of Syracuse

References

Syracuse
Mayors